Nam Suat is a watercourse in Nan Province, Thailand. It is a tributary of the Yom River, part of the Chao Phraya River basin.

Suat